Paar Magaley Paar is a 1963 Indian Tamil-language drama film directed by A. Bhimsingh and written by Valampuri Somanathan. Based on the play Petral Thaan Pillaiya by Pattu, which in turn was based on the Hindi film Parvarish (1958), it stars Sivaji Ganesan, M. R. Radha, Sowcar Janaki and C. R. Vijayakumari. The film was released on 12 July 1963.

Plot 
Zamindar Sivalingam is married to Lakshmiammal and takes his family's prestige and heritage very seriously. Dancer Sulochana and Lakshmiammal have baby girls at the same time in the same hospital.

Sivalingam is not in town at the time of the delivery and his close friend Ramaswamy takes care of Lakshmiammal. When the babies are taken for cleaning by the nurses, there is a short circuit and both nurses die. There is no way of identifying the babies. Sulochana who was abandoned by her husband, leaves the hospital. The doctor brings both babies to Lakshmiammal and she is not able to identify her baby either.

Sivalingam arrives and seeing both babies in the room assumes he has twins. Knowing how important the family line is to him, Lakshmiammal, Ramaswamy and the doctor don't tell him the truth. Both girls, Chandra and Kantha grow up as the zamindar's daughters. Sulochana's brother, Nadaraj, who learns that his niece is growing up in Sivalingam's household and faced with the same confusion, takes up Lakshmiammal's offer and stays on there as a caretaker. Meanwhile, Lakshmiammal and Ramaswamy's wife, Parvathi, who are childhood friends promise to get their children married to each other.

Chandra has a birthmark which is said to be very lucky, but is by nature more like her Lakshmiammal. Kantha is more like Sivalingam. Chandra falls in love with her classmate Shekar. Since he is the son of his wealthy friend, the late Mohanasundaram, Sivalingam agrees to the wedding.

Ramaswamy, who lives lavishly and who is careless in his business matters, faces severe business losses and approaches Sivalingam to back him in business matters. Sivalingam promises to give him money, but refuses to let him use his name or claim his acquaintance. He also gives a job to Sundaram in one of his factories, but refuses to have any further contacts with their family.

When Ramaswamy and Parvathi hear that Chandra's engagement is fixed, they attend the function uninvited. Sivalingam insults them and Ramaswamy is driven to reveal that one of his daughters is not his own. The doctor who was also present there needs to confide too. The engagement is stopped and the family is thrown into confusion. Due to this, Shekar's mother (Rukmani) forces him to leave the place.

Sivalingam refuses to talk to his family or the children and becomes extremely disturbed. Chandra tries to solve the problem by leaving the house. She gives a lady called Maragatham her ring to act as the dancer Sulochana. Maragatham goes to Sivalingam's house and says that her daughter can be identified by means of a birthmark.

The police arrive with some jewels and a suicide note from Chandra and they realise that she is now dead. Sivalingam is very happy when he finally becomes convinced that Kantha is his real daughter and fixes her marriage with Shekar. Lakshmiammal is very disturbed because she believes that all the confusion in the house was caused because they did not keep their word to Ramaswamy and Parvathi and get one of the daughters married to Sundaram.

Kantha wants to humiliate Sivalingam, whose conceit caused Chandra's death and she made Lakshiammal practically bedridden. She refuses to marry Shekar and says that she will marry Sundaram. Meanwhile, Nadaraj, who was thrown out of the house by Sivalingam, traces Maragatham through the ring that she tried to pawn and the family is again thrown into confusion.

Meanwhile, Chandra, who attempts suicide by jumping into a river is saved by the students of an ashram. They persuade her to stay on as a teacher to the orphan students and she agrees. Shekar who is now an Education Inspector comes to the school and sees her. The principal, however, convinces him that she is an orphan girl who always lived in the ashram.

Shekar then narrates the story of Chandra and also tells the principal that her sacrifice was wasted because Maragatham confessed the truth. He also tells her that both Sivalingam and Lakshmi are bedridden and that Kantha is struggling to care for both parents. Chandra wants to go back home, but makes up her mind to move away instead. She requests a transfer. Nadaraj overhears the principal and Chandra talking and is realises that Chandra is alive. He tells Sivalingam and Lakshmiammal and they set out in search of her.

Chandra's taxi hits Sivalingam and he is admitted in the hospital. Both daughters give him blood and he understands that character is more important than family's prestige and heritage. Sivalingam who had turned over a new leaf accepts both Chandra and Kantha as his daughters. Finally, Chandra marries Shekar and Kantha marries Sundaram as both Sivalingam and Ramaswamy reunited.

Cast 
Sivaji Ganesan as Zamindar Sivalingam
Sowcar Janaki as Lakshmi
R. Muthuraman as Shekar
C. R. Vijayakumari as Chandra / Saradha
A. V. M. Rajan as Sundaram
Pushpalatha as Kaantha
Kumari Rukmini as (Shekar's mother)
V. K. Ramasamy as Ramasamy (Sundaram's father)
M. R. Radha as Nataraj (Dance Teacher)
A. Karunanidhi as Manickam (Nataraj assistant)
Cho as Madasamy
Manorama as Aaravalli
N. Seethalakshmi
Radhabhai as Parvathi (Ramasamy's wife, Sundaram's mother)
S. R. Janaki as Principal
Thambaram Lalitha as Doctor
M. S. S. Bhagyam as Maragatham
Seethalakshmi as Aravalli's mother

Production 
Paar Magaley Paar was a film adaptation of the stage play Petral Thaan Pillaiya, itself based on the Hindi film Parvarish (1958). The play had the concept of two sons, but it was changed to daughters for the film. As a result, Y. G. Mahendran, who portrayed one of the two sons in the play and was signed on to reprise the role in the film, was unable to do so. Cho Ramaswamy, who played a character named "Mechanical Madasamy" in the play, reprised his role in the film, which also marked his cinematic acting debut. Ganesan's home, Annai Illam, also features in the film.

Music 
The soundtrack was composed by Viswanathan–Ramamoorthy, while the lyrics were written by Kannadasan and "Kavi Yogi" Shuddhananda Bharathiyar.

Release and reception 
Writing for Sport and Pastime, T. M. Ramachandran derided the film, comparing it unfavourably to the original play but praised the performance of the cast, particularly Ganesan. Kanthan of Kalki, however, reviewed the film more positively for the cast performances and emotional incidents.

References

External links 

1960s Tamil-language films
1963 drama films
1963 films
Films directed by A. Bhimsingh
Films scored by Viswanathan–Ramamoorthy
Indian drama films
Indian films based on plays